Dima Gorin's Career is a 1961 Soviet comedy film directed by Frunze Dovlatyan and Lev Mirsky.

Plot 
The film tells about the employee of the savings bank, who as a result of his mistake was forced to go to the construction site in Siberia, where he found his love.

Cast 
 Aleksandr Demyanenko as Dmitry Grigoryevich Gorin
 Tatyana Konyukhova as Galya Beryozka, brigadier
Vladimir Seleznyov as Gennady Drobot, brigadier
Vladimir Vysotsky as driver Sofron
Yevgeny Kudryashyov as Ivan Moskalyov, brigade member from Mosikha
Nikolai Kazakov as member of Drobot brigade
Aleksei Vanin as Panteley, member of Drobot brigade
Vitaly Chermenyov as Pavlik
 Valentina Ananina as member of Beryozka brigade
 Zinovy Gerdt as narrator

References

External links 
 

1961 films
1960s Russian-language films
Gorky Film Studio films
Soviet comedy films
1961 comedy films